Dastjerdeh (also known as Dasgirdah, Dastgerd, Dastgerdeh, and Dastjerd) is a village in Qarah Kahriz Rural District, Qarah Kahriz District, Shazand County, Markazi Province, Iran. At the 2006 census, its population was 700, in 148 families.

References 

Populated places in Shazand County